Litchfield is a census-designated place in Lassen County, California. Its population is 160 as of the 2020 census, down from 195 from the 2010 census.

History

The first post office at Litchfield opened in 1914, and moved in 1941. The name honors pioneer Thomas Litch.

The United States Bureau of Land Management maintains a wild horse and burro corral near Litchfield. The hay barn at the facility was set on fire by members of the Earth Liberation Front on October 15, 2001.

Geography

Climate
This region experiences warm (but not hot) and dry summers, with no average monthly temperatures above .  According to the Köppen Climate Classification system, Litchfield has a warm-summer Mediterranean climate, abbreviated "Csb" on climate maps.

Demographics

At the 2010 census Litchfield had a population of 195. The racial makeup of Litchfield was 176 (90.3%) White, 0 (0.0%) African American, 0 (0.0%) Native American, 0 (0.0%) Asian, 0 (0.0%) Pacific Islander, 14 (7.2%) from other races, and 5 (2.6%) from two or more races. Hispanic or Latino of any race were 25 people (12.8%).

The whole population lived in households; no one lived in non-institutionalized group quarters and no one was institutionalized.

There were 77 households, 22 (28.6%) had children under the age of 18 living in them, 41 (53.2%) were opposite-sex married couples living together, 4 (5.2%) had a female householder with no husband present, 10 (13.0%) had a male householder with no wife present.  There were 11 (14.3%) unmarried opposite-sex partnerships, and 0 (0%) same-sex married couples or partnerships. 12 households (15.6%) were one person and 5 (6.5%) had someone living alone who was 65 or older. The average household size was 2.53.  There were 55 families (71.4% of households); the average family size was 2.80.

The age distribution was 46 people (23.6%) under the age of 18, 16 people (8.2%) aged 18 to 24, 39 people (20.0%) aged 25 to 44, 64 people (32.8%) aged 45 to 64, and 30 people (15.4%) who were 65 or older.  The median age was 43.9 years. For every 100 females, there were 97.0 males.  For every 100 females age 18 and over, there were 101.4 males.

There were 94 housing units at an average density of 23.8 per square mile, of the occupied units 52 (67.5%) were owner-occupied and 25 (32.5%) were rented. The homeowner vacancy rate was 0%; the rental vacancy rate was 24.2%.  105 people (53.8% of the population) lived in owner-occupied housing units and 90 people (46.2%) lived in rental housing units.

Politics

References

Census-designated places in Lassen County, California
Census-designated places in California